Laxminagar Colony is a gated community in Hyderabad, India. It is near the Gudimalkapur crossroads, near Mehdipatnam, on the Ring Road that leads to Bangalore from Hyderabad.

This colony consists of 30–40 independent bungalow/houses. Bordering this colony on its Western side is a large Indian Army establishment.

Commercial area
Shopping options are ample as it is close to Mehdipatnam and Gudimalkapur. One road leads to Nanalnagar where there is a More Supermarket apart from a host of kirana and other shops.

This road continues to Gudimalkapaur on the other side. Gudimalkapur is the site of the Gudimalkapur Wholesale Vegetable Market and Heritage Fresh.

Transport
Since this colony is close to Mehdipatnam it is well connected by TSRTC buses.

Neighbourhoods in Hyderabad, India